Radenac is a commune in the Morbihan department in Brittany in north-western France.

Geography
The river Ével has its source in the commune.

People
Cyclist Jean Robic, who won the Tour de France in 1947, spent his childhood in Radenac, where his father owned the local cycle shop.  In honour of his great achievement, the commune renamed the street where his home was after him.

Population
Inhabitants of Radenac are called Radenacois.

Twin towns
Radenac is twinned with a small village of Radnage in Buckinghamshire .

Monuments
 The fountain of St Armel (circa 1000)
 The fountain of St Fiacre (17th century)
 The chapelle St Fiacre (construction 1390 to 1514).

See also
Communes of the Morbihan department

References

External links

 Mayors of Morbihan Association 

Communes of Morbihan